Rhodacra leptalea is a species of moth of the family Tortricidae first described by Józef Razowski in 2013. It is found on Seram Island in Indonesia. The habitat consists of upper montane forests.

The wingspan is about 15 mm. The forewings are pale ferruginous, slightly tinged with orange posteriorly and more cinnamon along the dorsum. The strigulation (fine streaks) is brownish and there are dark brown marks inside the median cell. The hindwings are grey brown, but paler basally.

Etymology
The species name refers to the shape of the aedeagus and is derived from Greek leptaleos (meaning slender).

References

Moths described in 2013
Olethreutini